The Novgorod Theological Seminary is a secondary theological educational institution of the Novgorod diocese of the Russian Orthodox Church, which existed in 1740–1918.

History 

In 1706, Metropolitan Job of Novgorod opened the Novgorod Greek-Slavonic School at his bishop's house and summoned the exiled Greek scholars brothers Joannicius and Sophronius Likhud, whom he met while living in Moscow, to lead it. At the expense of the funds of the St. Sophia Cathedral, he organized the construction of a two-story building for the school; the students, who numbered up to 153 people, were kept at the expense of the metropolitan, who put his book collection at their disposal. The Novgorod school was an attempt to create an Orthodox educational institution based on the patristic tradition, and not intended for scholastic disputes. Latin was not taught here at all. With the appointment of Theophan Prokopovich as archbishop in Novgorod, these Novgorod schools were abolished.

In the 1730s, a number of bishops' schools were transformed into seminaries as a result of the introduction of the Latin curriculum. The basis for the opening of a theological seminary in Veliky Novgorod was the decree of Empress Anna Ioannovna of September 21, 1738. The seminary was opened through the efforts of the Archbishop Ambrose (Yushkevich) of Novgorod.

A document drawn up in the Holy Synod, apparently with the participation of Ambrose himself, approved by the Decree of Empress Anna Ioannovna of May 24, 1740, reads: grammar even to rhetoric, philosophy and theology...”.

By decree of October 30 (November 10), 1740, Archbishop Ambrose determined to open a seminary in the Antoniev Monastery, closest to Novgorod. According to the staff, the activities of the Novgorod City Palace of Culture were regulated in detail from the very beginning and provided financially. 7,859 rubles 37 kopecks per year were allocated for its maintenance, which far exceeded the financial support of other seminaries. According to the funds allocated for its maintenance, it left other seminaries far behind, that is, it was actually a higher educational institution, although it did not bear the name "academy". For example, in 1765, when the Novgorod Theological Seminary had a staffing of 8,285 rubles, the Moscow Theological Academy received 4,847 rubles, the Trinity Seminary - 4,901 rubles, and other seminaries - much less. Apart from the Novgorod Seminary, only the St. Petersburg Seminary had a staff salary.

On April 12, 1741, Archbishop Ambrose addressed a report to Anna Leopoldovna, regent under the infant emperor John Antonovich, reporting on his intention to choose for the construction of “not already a seminary, but a large Academy following the example of the Kiev schools ... the monastery of Anthony the Roman”, where “it should be the staff of 10 schools, as well as a stone library for the maintenance of books, and for a better order and review of this Academy, it has been determined to be ... archimandrite and rector ... following the example of the Kiev and Moscow Academies. Vladyka also asked “following the example of Kiev, Kharkov and other foreign academies to approve this academy with a diploma.” A resolution was imposed on the report by Anna Leopoldovna: "The use of the monastery of Anthony the Roman for the life of teachers and students is allowed, and the structure of the stone new Academy is also being tested."

The first students of the seminary were 100 best students of the school at the bishop's house, which for some time remained preparatory for the seminary. With regard to the organization of education, the seminary was almost an exact copy of the Kiev Theological Academy, whose graduate was Archbishop Ambrose. Initially, there were four classes in the seminary. Первоначально в семинарии было четыре класса: analogies, infims, grammars, syntaxes. In 1741, a class of piitika (poetic) appeared, and in 1742 - rhetoric (oratory) and drawing.

In 1741, according to the project of the St. Petersburg architect Ivan Filippov, two stone buildings were built in the Anthony Monastery. One of them housed classes, the other housed teachers. Wooden huts were built for the seminarians, and a stone barn in the southern part of the monastery was converted into a bakery. Later, in 1840, the building was built on and adapted for a seminary hospital, an infirmary was built outside the monastery walls.

Managed affairs in the seminary the rector, who is also the archimandrite of the monastery, and the prefect. The rector was in charge of educational, moral, educational and economic affairs. The prefect was an assistant to the rector and a direct observer of the exact implementation of all the orders established in the seminary. Archbishop Ambrose drew up the charter of the seminary and the staff, which consisted of 12 teachers. The seminary accepted boys from 12 to 15 years old, taught to read and write.

In 1746 a philosophy class was opened, in 1748 a theology class. In 1754, the first issue took place.

Severe discipline was the basis of seminary education. For violation of the established rules, they were subjected to cruel punishments, up to whips and shackles. Flight from the seminary was common: in 1748 there were 94 on the run.

Archbishop Ambrose (Yushkevich) obtained permission from Empress Elizaveta Petrovna to transfer Theophan Prokopovich's library to the Novgorod Theological Seminary, for which he decided to build a stone building. However, the construction of the building began only in 1759 and was completed in the 1780s according to the estimates of the provincial architect Vasily Polivanov. The upper floor of this two-story building was allocated for the library, which was “like one common large hall with two lights”, in which there were wooden bookcases. This is one of the first buildings in the history of Russian architecture, specially built for the library. It is a rare monument of baroque architecture for Novgorod. A two-storey building with two side risalits and elegant facades has been well preserved in the eastern part of the monastery; now it houses the library of the Yaroslav-the-Wise Novgorod State University.

The library of the Novgorod Theological Seminary is one of the oldest Russian libraries. Money was allocated annually for the purchase of new books, this made it possible to create the richest book fund. G.I. Svetlov in the book “A Brief Essay on the History of the Novgorod Theological Seminary”, published in 1917, reports that the library of Ambrose Yushkevich “formed the basis of that rich book depository, which, having given part of its treasures, and even the best, to the St. Petersburg Theological Academy, should be considered now the best and the largest of the existing theological seminaries. It also included the library of the Likhudov school. A larger number of books, according to the catalog of 1779 (the earliest known catalog of the library), in the middle of the 18th century was only in the library of the Imperial Academy of Sciences in St. Petersburg. The catalog of 1779 includes a description of the books in the library of Feofan Prokopovich, books received from the bishop's house, from the libraries of archbishops Ambrose Yushkevich, Stefan Kalinovsky, Anthony Znamensky, metropolitans Dmitry Sechenov and Gavriil Petrov. The register contains descriptions of about 6,500 books. According to the register, the library included rare editions of Scripture, the collection of Greek and Latin classics was also exceptionally rich and varied, and the works of humanist writers were extremely numerous in the book collection.

After the revolution, the library of the seminary was transferred to the administration of the Gubmuseum. Some of the books were sent to the National Library of Russia (including handwritten books, the library of Feofan (Prokopovich), printed editions of the 17th-18th centuries), some of the books were preserved in the Department of Rare Books of the Scientific Library of the Novgorod Museum-Reserve.

In 1788–1800, the status of the Novgorod Seminary was reduced to the level of a four-class one.

During the 19th century, changes took place in the life of the Novgorod Seminary. The severity and severity of the bursa of the 18th - early 19th centuries gave way to a humane attitude towards students.

For the 150th anniversary of the seminary, under the rector, Archpriest Evgraf Megorsky, a new large building was built with a front facade on the Volkhov. The celebration of the anniversary took place on October 30, 1890, it was headed by Bishop Vladimir Bogoyavlensky.

The number of students in the seminary by the beginning of the 20th century reached 500 people. Annual graduations averaged 50 people.

At the end of April 1918, the educational activities of the Novgorod Theological Seminary actually ceased. On September 30, 1918, the Novgorod provincial department of public education decided to close the Novgorod Theological Seminary, and on October 1, 1919, the Novgorod Institute of Public Education was opened on its basis, which ended up with the fundamental library of the seminary. In 1920, the Anthony Monastery was abolished.

References

Universities in Russia
1706 establishments in Russia
Educational institutions established in 1706
Educational institutions disestablished in 1918
Buildings and structures in Veliky Novgorod
Cultural heritage monuments of federal significance in Novgorod Oblast